Mariana Alley Griswold Van Rensselaer (February 21, 1851 – January 20, 1934), usually known as Mrs. Schuyler Van Rensselaer or M. G. Van Rensselaer, was an American author focusing on architectural criticism.

Early life
Mariana Alley Griswold was born in New York City on February 21, 1851.  She was the daughter of George Griswold and Lydia (née Alley) Griswold (1826–1908).  Her younger brothers were Frank Gray Griswold (1855–1937), the stepfather of Cass Canfield, and George Griswold (1857–1917), the vice president and general manager of the Tuxedo Park Association.

In 1868, she moved with her family to Dresden, Germany, where she remained for five years.

Career
She began writing in 1876.  The first woman architectural critic, she grew in influence in the 1880s. However, her publications encompassed also art and landscape architecture criticism, fiction, and children's literature. She wrote articles in American Art Review, Century Magazine, and Garden and Forest (in which she wrote many unattributed articles) After refuting an offer to edit the American Art Review in 1881, she began writing for Century Magazine.  She advocated that the public should view architectural works, not as just the work of the individual firm owners, but the entire firm (particularly in reference to McKim, Mead, and White), and preferred architectural training at colleges for creating intellectual and genteel architects, rather than the on-the-job training which was common at the time.

Around 1890, Van Rensselaer garnered an honorary membership to the American Institute of Architects, and in 1920 to the American Society of Landscape Architects  In 1910, she received the degree of D. Litt. from Columbia University, the accomplishment being an extraordinary one for a woman at that time. She was awarded the 1923 American Academy of Arts and Letters Gold Medal. In 1915, in honor of deceased son, she donated a collection of reproductions of frescoes, vases, and other objects which illustrate the prehistoric culture of Greece to Fogg Art Museum of Harvard University.

Van Rensselaer also served a number of charitable organisations, including University Settlement Women's Auxiliary (president from 1896-1898), Jacob A. Riis Neighborhood Settlement, and the New York Infirmary for Women and Children. She was president of the Public Education Association of New York from 1899-1906. Although she did vote in 1893 while living in Colorado, she later was involved with New York State Association Opposed to the Extension of Suffrage for Women.

Personal life
In 1873, she married Schuyler Van Rensselaer (1845–1884) of the prominent Van Rensselaer family.  Together, they lived in New Brunswick, New Jersey. They had one child, born in February 1875, before her husband, a mining engineer, died in 1884.

 George Griswold Van Rensselaer (1875–1894), who died before his twentieth birthday and was a member of Harvard University's class of 1896.

Van Rensselaer died away while in New York City on January 20, 1934.  She was buried next to her husband and only child at Green-Wood Cemetery in Brooklyn, New York.

Works
Her writings include:
 American Etchers (New York, 1886)
 Henry Hobson Richardson and his Works (1888)
 
 English Cathedrals (1892; fourth edition, 1892)
 Art out of Doors (1893)
 “The Development of American Homes” article in the book “Household Art” edited by Candace Wheeler (New York, Harper & Brothers, 1893) compiled for the 1893 Chicago Columbian Exposition). Mrs. Van Rensselaer’s article was also printed in The Forum magazine.
 "Fifth Avenue", The Century Magazine (1893) Examined the new development around Central Park.
 Should We Ask for the Suffrage? (1894)
 One Man Who was Content (1896)
 Niagara, a Description (1901)
 History of the City of New York in the Seventeenth Century (1909)
 Poems (1910)
  Wilhelm Reinhold Valentiner, The Art of the Low Countries, translated by Mrs. Schuyler Van Rensselaer (1914)

Notes

References
 "American Country Dwellings." Parts I-III. The Century Magazine. 1886.

Further reading
 Judith K. Major. Mariana Griswold Van Rensselaer: A Landscape Critic in the Gilded Age (University of Virginia Press; 2013) 302 pages; scholarly biography

External links
 Pioneering Women of American Architecture, Mariana Griswold Van Rensselaer
 
 
 
 Augustus Saint-Gaudens (1848–1907), Mrs. Schuyler Van Rensselaer (Mariana Griswold), 1888; this cast, 1890

American people of English descent
Columbia University alumni
Historians from New York (state)
1851 births
1934 deaths
American women historians
Writers from New York City
Writers from New Brunswick, New Jersey
Griswold family
Historians of New York City
German–English translators
Historians from New Jersey
Van Rensselaer family